Amer Al-Sadeq is the founder and representative of the Syrian Revolution Coordinators Union the organization includes coordination groups and activists of the Syrian Revolution of 2011 who belong to different Syrian cities and areas. The Syrian Revolution Coordinators Union is the first organization to include groups and individual activists aiming to topple the totalitarian Assad family government. Amer Al-Sadeq has been a prominent media figure through his many media interviews and public statements expressing the demands and viewpoints of the revolution in both Arabic and English languages.

2011 Syrian revolution
He participated in the peaceful protests asking for the downfall of the Assad family government in Syria. As a dissident he managed through a network of supporting members working within the government to leak a number of vital documents proving that the government has involved its military judicial system to liquidate activists and detainees inside security branches.

Syrian Revolution Coordinators Union
As the head of the founding committee he established the Syrian Revolution Coordinators Union with a number of other representatives from coordination groups. He co-wrote the constitutional statement of the organization and participate in forming its attitude and directions.

Most important media statements
 Declared the SRCU's attitude regarding the call for dialogue claimed by the Syrian government while the government forces where still inside Syrian cities and detainees were still no released.
 Talked for the first time ever about the Syrian Field Military Court which start executing death sentences since the beginning of 2012 on activists and defected military people including the most famous Lieutenant colonel; Al-Harmoush

External links

 Official website of the Syrian Revolution Coordinators Union
 English Language Interview with Amer Al-Sadeq
 

Living people
People of the Syrian civil war
Syrian democracy activists
Syrian dissidents
Year of birth missing (living people)